Hipólito Gómez de las Roces Pinilla (Nava, Spain, 1932) is a Spanish politician who belongs to the Aragonese Party (PAR) and who previously served as President of the Government of Aragon, one of the Spanish regional administrations, from 1987 to 1991.

References

1932 births
Living people
Presidents of the Government of Aragon
Members of the constituent Congress of Deputies (Spain)
Members of the 1st Congress of Deputies (Spain)
Members of the Cortes of Aragon